was a Japanese samurai of the Edo period. The son of Tokugawa Harusada, head of the Hitotsubashi-Tokugawa house, he succeeded Tokugawa Haruaki as head of the Tayasu branch of the Tokugawa house, which had been without a ruler for some time. His childhood name was Yoshinosuke (慶之丞).

Family
 Father: Tokugawa Harusada (1751-1827), 2nd head of Hitotsubashi-Tokugawa house, and grandson of the 8th shōgun Tokugawa Yoshimune
 Mother: Maruyama-dono
 Wife: Kan’in no Miya Sadako (1787-1825)
 Concubines:
 Kakei-dono
 Yagi-dono
 Kawai-dono
 Saito-dono
 Shinozaki-dono (1794-1858)
 Takatsuki-dono
 Oran no Kata (1796-1817)
 Children:
 Kinhime (1800-1830) married Tokugawa Narinori of Hitotsubashi-Tokugawa family by Sadako
 Shizuhime (1803-1803) by Sadako
 Tokugawa Masatoki (1805-1839) by Sadako
 Naohime (1807-1872) married Tokugawa Naritaka of Owari Domain (and son of the 11th shōgun Tokugawa Ienari) by Sadako
 Takeshisuke (1799-1800) by Kakei
 Tsuhime (1800-1801) by Kakei
 Hi-hime (1805-1860) married Matsudaira Sadamichi of Kuwana Domain by Yagi
 Ryohime (1808-1890) married Sakai Tadaaki of Obama Domain by Yagi
 Aihime (1813-1832) married Tokugawa Nariharu of Owari Domain (and son of the 11th shōgun Tokugawa Ienari) by Yagi
 Tokugawa Yoshihisa (1823-1847) of Hitotsubashi-Tokugawa Family by Yagi
 Sonosuke (1824-1825) by Yagi
 Miru’in (1807-1807) by Kawai
 Kenzaburo (1814-1817) by Kawai
 Suruda-hime (1807-1820) betrothed to Tsugaru Nobuyuki of Hirosaki Domain by Saito
 Kinhime (1809-1851) married Tsugaru Nobuyuki of Hirosaki Domain as second Wife by Saito
 Kihime (1811-1817) betrothed to Matsudaira Sadakazu of Kuwana Domain by Shonozaki
 San-sen hime (1818-1820) by Shonozaki
 Senjuhime (1821-1860) married Matsudaira Takeshige of Hamada Domain
 Tokugawa Yoshiyori of Tayasu-Tokugawa Family by Shonozaki
 Tsunehime (1815-1819) by Takatsuki
 Toshihime (1816-1818) by Takatsuki
 Tokugawa Narikura (1818-1837) of Hitotsubashi-Tokugawa Family by Takatsuki
 Junhime (1821-1906) married Tachibana Akitomo of Yanagawa Domain by Takatsuki
 Yaehime (1823-1826) by Takatsuki
 Ikunosuke (1825-1826) by Takatsuki
 Itarihime (1824-1826) by Oran
 Matsudaira Shungaku of Fukui Domain by Oran
 Fudehime (1830-1886) married Nabeshima Naomasa of Saga Domain by Oran
 Tokugawa Yoshitsugu of Owari Domain by Oran

Ancestry

References

1779 births
1848 deaths
Samurai
Tokugawa clan